The following is a list of past operators of the BAC One-Eleven. As of September 23, 2014, there are no BAC One-Eleven airline operators, and no BAC One-Eleven aircraft operating for any military entities.

Civil operators
 ADC Airlines
 Adria Airways
 Aer Lingus
 Aeroamerica (U.S. charter carrier which operated former American Airlines aircraft in Europe)
 Air Illinois
 Air Malawi 
 Air Manchester
 Air Pacific
 Air Siam
 Air UK
 Airways International Cymru
 / Air Wisconsin
 Allegheny Airlines
 Aloha Airlines 
 American Airlines  
 Anglo Cargo Airlines
 Arkia
 / Atlantic Gulf Airlines
 Austral 
 Autair International 
 Aviateca
 Bavaria Fluggesellschaft 
 Braniff International Airways 
 Bahamasair 
 Belize Airways
 British Air Ferries
 British Airways 
 British Caledonian Airways 
 British Eagle 
 British European Airways 
 British Island Airways
 British Midland Airways 
 British United Airways 
 / Britt Airways
 Caledonian Airways 
 Cambrian Airways
 Cascade Airways
 Cayman Airways
 Central African Airways
 Channel Airways 
 Court Line 
 Aerotaxi Monse
 Cyprus Airways 
 Dan-Air
 European Aviation Air Charter
 Faucett - Three operated.
 Florida Express
 Germanair 
 Gulf Aviation
 Gulf Air
 Hapag-Lloyd
 Hold Trade Air
 Kabo Air
 LACSA 
 LADECO - Four ex-Dan Air aircraft leased from 1990. Last aircraft retired 1994.
 Laker Airways 
 LANICA
 Lauda Air
 Leeward Islands Air Transport (LIAT)
 London European Airways
 Mohawk Airlines 
 Monarch Airlines
 Nordair
 Okada Air
 Orientair
 Paninternational 
 Pacific Express
 Philippine Airlines 
 Quebecair
 Romavia
 Ryanair
 Sadia 
 SARO Servicio Aereo Rutas Oriente
 SCAT Airlines
 TACA Airlines 
 TAE 
 TAROM 
 Transbrasil - operated 10 aircraft from 1970 to 1978.
 USAir
 VASP - operated two from 1968 to 1974.
 / Wright Airlines
 Zambia Airways
 Nationwide Airlines
 Aero Asia International

Military and government operators

Military 

 Royal Australian Air Force  - Two aircraft from 1967 to 1990.
 No. 34 Squadron RAAF

 Brazilian Air Force - Two aircraft, with the Brazilian Air Force designation VC-92, operated in VIP role from 1968 to 1974.

 Royal Air Force of Oman 

 Philippine Air Force (1974-1984)
 702 Squadron

 Royal Air Force 
 Empire Test Pilots' School
 Royal Aircraft Establishment

Government 

 Mexican Government

 Philippine Government

Romanian Government
 
Government of the United Arab Emirates

Corporate operators
The One-Eleven was also operated by corporate operators, particularly in the United States and the Middle East.  An example was Tenneco, a US-based company.

References

One-Eleven
BAC One-Eleven